Vidonje is a village located in the municipality of Zažablje, in Dubrovnik-Neretva County, Croatia.

Further reading
 http://www.metkovic.hr/povijest/govor_sela_vidonje.pdf

References 

Populated places in Dubrovnik-Neretva County